Sandstone Valley is a suburban neighbourhood in northwest Calgary, Alberta, Canada. Located northwest of the community of Beddington Heights, this primarily low-density residential community is bounded by Country Hills Boulevard to the north, Beddington Trail to the east, Berkshire Boulevard to the south and 14th Street W to the west. The Nose Hill Park is located southwest from the community.

It is represented in the Calgary City Council by the Ward 4 councillor.

Development of this community began in 1982, and was recently completed.

Demographics

Residents in this community had a median household income of $75,002 in 2000, and there were 13% low income residents living in the neighbourhood. As of 2000, 36.2% of the residents were immigrants. A proportion of 1% of the buildings were condominiums or apartments, and 8.6% of the housing was used for renting.

Education
In 2006, there were two schools in the district:
 Monsignor N. Anderson Elementary - Separate
 Simons Valley Elementary School - Public

See also
List of neighbourhoods in Calgary

References

External links
Calgary Area - Sandstone/MacEwan Community Info

Neighbourhoods in Calgary